Juri De Marco (born 12 July 1979 in Benevento) is an Italian football goalkeeper who currently plays for Perugia Calcio.

Appearances on Italian Series 

Serie B : 1 app

Serie C1 : 2 apps

Serie C2 : 24 apps

Total : 27 apps

External links
http://aic.football.it/scheda/13763/de-marco-juri.htm

Italian footballers
Living people
1984 births
Association football goalkeepers
A.C. Perugia Calcio players